Fujairah Heritage Village is a heritage-based tourist attraction located close to Madhab Spring Park and Madhab Palace, northwest of Fujairah City, Emirate of Fujairah, United Arab Emirates (UAE).

The site is used to present customs and traditions of the UAE. It includes traditional hand-held implements, household items, models of traditional homes, and tools as used by historical people in Fujairah. The Heritage Village is surrounded by a high wall with round watchtowers. There are tours to the Heritage Village.

References

Year of establishment missing
Tourist attractions in the United Arab Emirates
Villages in the United Arab Emirates
Cultural history of the United Arab Emirates
Buildings and structures in the Emirate of Fujairah
Geography of the Emirate of Fujairah
Fujairah City
Open-air museums in the United Arab Emirates
Rural history museums in the United Arab Emirates